The 1967 ICF Canoe Slalom World Championships were held in Lipno nad Vltavou, Czechoslovakia under the auspices of International Canoe Federation. It was the 10th edition. The mixed C2 team event was not held after having been done so at the previous championships.

Medal summary

Men's

Canoe

Kayak

Mixed

Canoe

Women's

Kayak

Medals table

References

External links
International Canoe Federation

Icf Canoe Slalom World Championships, 1967
ICF Canoe Slalom World Championships
International sports competitions hosted by Czechoslovakia
Icf Canoe Slalom World Championships, 1967